Sanchez Mira, officially the Municipality of Sanchez Mira, is a 3rd class municipality in the province of Cagayan, Philippines. According to the 2020 census, it has a population of 26,164 people.

Lying on a latitude of 18 degrees, 34 minutes north and a longitude of 121 degrees, 14 minutes east, the municipality is bounded on the north by the Babuyan Channel; on the south by the municipality of Luna, Apayao; on the east by the municipality of Pamplona, Cagayan; and on the west by the municipality of Claveria, Cagayan.

Formerly called Malukkit (a barrio in ancient Pamplona meaning "Nagsisiraan"), the name "Sanchez Mira" was given in honor of Manuel Sanchez Mira, a Spanish Brigadier General assigned in the Cagayan Valley.

Geography

Barangays
Sanchez Mira is politically subdivided into 18 barangays. These barangays are headed by elected officials: Barangay Captain, Barangay Council, whose members are called Barangay Councilors. All are elected every three years.

Climate

Demographics

Economy

Government
Sanchez Mira, belonging to the second legislative district of the province of Cagayan, is governed by a mayor designated as its local chief executive and by a municipal council as its legislative body in accordance with the Local Government Code. The mayor, vice mayor, and the councilors are elected directly by the people through an election which is being held every three years.

Elected officials

Education
The Schools Division of Cagayan governs the town's public education system. The division office is a field office of the DepEd in Cagayan Valley region. The office governs the public and private elementary and public and private high schools throughout the municipality.

References

External links
 [ Philippine Standard Geographic Code]
Philippine Census Information

Municipalities of Cagayan